The Grigorovich MU-2 was a trainer flying boat built in the Soviet Union in the mid-1920s. It was designed by the Grigorovich Design Bureau after the failure of the Grigorovich MUR-1, featuring an all-metal hull. However, it was never put into production due to poor performance and sluggish take-off behavior.

Specifications

References

Bibliography
 

1920s Soviet patrol aircraft
Flying boats
High-wing aircraft
Aircraft first flown in 1928